The Khedivial Agricultural Society was the first Egyptian agricultural society founded in 1898 under the patronage of Husayn Kamil.  The foundation of the Khedivial Agricultural Society was impelled by the lack of a local, Egyptian controlled agricultural society that could conduct scientific studies to mitigate agricultural problems under the British Occupation.

References

External links
Journal of the Khedivial Agricultural Society and the School of Agriculture

Agriculture in Egypt